Bruce McCandless I (August 12, 1911 – January 24, 1968) was an officer of United States Navy who received the Medal of Honor during World War II for his heroism on board , during the Naval Battle of Guadalcanal, November 13, 1942. He retired with the rank of rear admiral. McCandless was the father of NASA astronaut, Captain Bruce McCandless II, USN (Ret). Additionally, Admiral McCandless was the great-grandson of David Colbert McCanles of the Rock Creek Station, Nebraska, shoot-out with Wild Bill Hickok. After that, the McCanles family changed its name to McCandless and moved to Florence, Colorado.

Early life and family
The son of Rear Admiral (formerly Commodore) Byron McCandless (1881–1967), Bruce McCandless was born on August 12, 1911, in Washington, D.C. Following in his father's footsteps, Bruce graduated from the United States Naval Academy in 1932.

McCandless married Sue Worthington Bradley, daughter of Captain Willis W. Bradley, USN. They had two sons and two daughters, including NASA astronaut Bruce McCandless II.

Military service

McCandless served on the cruiser  and the destroyer . He was serving as communications officer of the cruiser  when the Empire of Japan attacked Pearl Harbor on December 7, 1941.
On November 13, 1942, during the Naval Battle of Guadalcanal, Japanese gunfire killed Rear Admiral Daniel J. Callaghan and his staff, including Captain Cassin Young and all other officers on San Franciscos bridge, except Lieutenant Commander McCandless, who took the conn for the rest of the battle. For his conduct, he was awarded the Medal of Honor, and promoted to full commander. San Francisco received the Presidential Unit Citation for this battle and, by the end of the war, was credited with 17 battle stars.

Cmdr. McCandless continued to serve on San Francisco until 1944, when he took command of the newly commissioned destroyer  on July 29 of the same year. On April 8, 1945, during the Battle of Okinawa, Gregory was attacked and damaged by four kamikazes and McCandless was awarded the Silver Star for conspicuous gallantry during the battle.

Captain McCandless retired on September 1, 1952, with a terminal promotion to the rank of rear admiral. He died in Washington, D.C., on January 24, 1968, and was buried in the Naval Academy Cemetery in Annapolis, Maryland.

Awards and honors

Medal of Honor citation

For conspicuous gallantry and exceptionally distinguished service above and beyond the call of duty as communication officer of the U.S.S. San Francisco in combat with enemy Japanese forces in the battle off Savo Island, 12–13 November 1942. In the midst of a violent night engagement, the fire of a determined and desperate enemy seriously wounded Lt. Comdr. McCandless and rendered him unconscious, killed or wounded the admiral in command, his staff, the captain of the ship, the navigator, and all other personnel on the navigating and signal bridges. Faced with the lack of superior command upon his recovery, and displaying superb initiative, he promptly assumed command of the ship and ordered her course and gunfire against an overwhelmingly powerful force. With his superiors in other vessels unaware of the loss of their admiral, and challenged by his great responsibility, Lt. Comdr. McCandless boldly continued to engage the enemy and to lead our column of following vessels to a great victory. Largely through his brilliant seamanship and great courage, the San Francisco was brought back to port, saved to fight again in the service of her country.

Legacy
In 1971, the frigate  was named in honor of RADM McCandless and his father, Commodore Byron McCandless. There is also a street at the U.S. Naval Academy named after Admiral McCandless, as well as the Colorado State Veterans Nursing Home in Florence, Colorado. Commodore Byron McCandless has a street named after him at the US Naval Base, San Diego, California.

See also

 List of Medal of Honor recipients
 List of Medal of Honor recipients for World War II

References

External links
 
 "The San Francisco Story", by RADM Bruce McCandless
 The Mccandless Family's Contribution to America

United States Navy personnel of World War II
United States Navy Medal of Honor recipients
United States Navy rear admirals (upper half)
United States Naval Academy alumni
Military personnel from Washington, D.C.
American people of Scotch-Irish descent
Burials at the United States Naval Academy Cemetery
Recipients of the Silver Star
1911 births
1968 deaths
World War II recipients of the Medal of Honor